The 2006 San Francisco Giants season was the Giants' 124th year in Major League Baseball, their 49th year in San Francisco since their move from New York following the 1957 season, and their sixth at AT&T Park. The team finished in third place in the National League West with a 76–85 record, 11½ games behind the San Diego Padres.

Regular season

Season summary
Barry Bonds of the Giants pursued his quest toward Hank Aaron's all-time mark of 755 home runs.  Bonds finished the season with 734 career home runs, 21 short of tying Aaron's mark. On June 3, 2006, Eliezer Alfonzo made his big league debut. In his debut, his name was misspelled on his jersey (it should have ended in "zo", not "so"). Alfonzo hit a two-run shot in the sixth inning that ultimately won the game against the Mets. The following day, the jersey was still misspelled. The Giants finished 76-85, 11½ games behind the division winner, the San Diego Padres, and also 11½ games behind the Los Angeles Dodgers.  The Giants finished in third place in their division, just ½ game ahead of both the Arizona Diamondbacks and Colorado Rockies, who both finished their season with a record of 76-86.

Season standings

National League West

Record vs. opponents

Notable transactions
December 8, 2005: Mark Sweeney was signed as a free agent with the San Francisco Giants.
June 6, 2006: Tim Lincecum was drafted by the San Francisco Giants in the 1st round (10th pick) of the 2006 amateur draft. Player signed June 30, 2006.
July 22, 2006: Jeremy Accardo was traded to the Toronto Blue Jays for third baseman Shea Hillenbrand and relief pitcher Vinnie Chulk.
July 28, 2006: Mike Stanton was traded by the Washington Nationals to the San Francisco Giants for Shairon Martis (minors).

Roster

Player stats

Batting
Note: G = Games played; AB = At bats; R = Runs; H = Hits; 2B = Doubles; 3B = Triples; HR = Home runs; RBI = Runs batted in; SB = Stolen bases; BB = Walks; AVG = Batting average; SLG = Slugging average

Source:

Pitching
Note: W = Wins; L = Losses; ERA = Earned run average; G = Games pitched; GS = Games started; SV = Saves; IP = Innings pitched; H = Hits allowed; R = Runs allowed; ER = Earned runs allowed; BB = Walks allowed; SO = Strikeouts

Source:

Awards and honors
 Omar Vizquel SS, Willie Mac Award
All-Star Game
 Jason Schmidt P

Farm system

LEAGUE CHAMPIONS: Salem-Keizer

References

External links

2006 San Francisco Giants season at Baseball Reference
Game Logs:
1st Half: San Francisco Giants Game Log on ESPN.com
2nd Half: San Francisco Giants Game Log on ESPN.com
Batting Statistics: San Francisco Giants Batting Stats on ESPN.com
Pitching Statistics: San Francisco Giants Pitching Stats on ESPN.com

San Francisco Giants seasons
San Francisco Giants
San Fran